Amorbia leptophracta is a species of moth of the family Tortricidae. It is found in Costa Rica, Colombia and Brazil.

References

Moths described in 1931
Sparganothini
Moths of Central America
Moths of South America